Auguste Anicet, later Auguste Anicet-Bourgeois (25 December 1806 – 12 January 1871) was a French dramatist. He was born in Paris.

The first play to bear his name is L'Ami et le mari, ou le Nouvel Amphitryon, a vaudeville in one act. It was produced in 1825, when the author was still in his teens.

Over the course of his career he was credited in the writing of nearly 200 plays, as many as ten a year. However the nature of theatrical collaboration at this time was such that the extent of his contribution to any given play is debatable. In fact it is known that he assisted Alexandre Dumas in the writing of several plays (Térésa, Angèle, Le Mari de la Veuve, La Vénitienne), sometimes without acknowledgement. He is the subject of an anecdote in Dumas's "Comment je devins auteur dramatique" ("How I became a Dramatist"), published in 1833 in Revue des Deux Mondes. Other writers with whom he worked were Philippe Dumanoir, Julien de Mallian, Victor Ducange, Francis Cornu, Lockroy, Édouard Brisebarre, Michel Masson and Paul Féval. One of his plays was adapted for the English stage as The Black Doctor (1846), a vehicle for Ira Aldridge.

Very little is known of his life beyond a connection to the military. Married, with one daughter, he was named Chevalier de la Légion d'honneur on 10 December 1849. He died on 12 January 1871 at Pau, Pyrénées-Atlantiques (a fortnight before the end of the Siege of Paris) and was buried in division 4 of Père-Lachaise.

Notes

External links
 

19th-century French dramatists and playwrights
Writers from Paris
Burials at Père Lachaise Cemetery
Chevaliers of the Légion d'honneur
19th-century French male writers
1806 births
1871 deaths